Thaunggyi is the name of several villages in Burma:

Thaunggyi (24°26"N 95°54"E) -Banmauk
Thaunggyi (24°18"N 95°56"E) - Banmauk